Hymenobacter pallidus is a bacterium from the genus of Hymenobacter which has been isolated from a pond in Taiwan.

References

External links
Type strain of Hymenobacter pallidus at BacDive -  the Bacterial Diversity Metadatabase

pallidus
Bacteria described in 2017